Karl Büsser is a retired Swiss sidecarcross passenger and double Sidecarcross World Champion, having won the competition in 1982 and 1983 as passenger of Emil Bollhalder.

Apart from his World and European Championship triumphs he has also won the Swiss national sidecarcross championship twice, in 1982 and 1983.

Biography
Karl Büsser made his debut in national and international sidecarcross in 1974 on the side of Ernst Ruegg, whose passenger he would remain until the end of the 1980 season. The two competed in what was originally the FIM-Cup and became the European Championship in 1975, to turn into the World Championship in 1980. The pair saw a continues improvement from season to season, finishing 21st overall in 1974 and coming in as high as fourth in 1977. After that, results declined again and, after two eleventh places in 1978 and 1979 the duo finished 17th in 1980. In between, Büsser raced for one Grand Prix in 1979 with German driver Reinhard Böhler who would become the first-ever World Champion in the sport the following year.

In the Swiss national championship between 1974 and 1978 the team generally finished between places three and six. Only in the 1980 season did they finish below that, coming eighth.

In 1981 Karl Büsser joined the team of Emil Bollhalder and, with his new driver, had much greater success than before. The two came second in the Swiss championship in 1981, followed by winning the competition in 1982 and 1983. In the World Championship the team came fourth in its first year together, followed by two championships, in 1982 and 1983. On both occasions, they relegated the German team of Josef Brockhausen and Hubert Rebele to second place, by 62 points in 1982 and 11 points in 1983.

After their double World Championship Karl Büsser retired from national and international competition at the end of the 1983 season, as did Emil Bollhalder.

Honours

World Championship
 Champions: (2) 1982, 1983

National Championships
 Swiss national championship: 
 Champions: (2) 1982, 1983
 Runners-up: (1) 1981

References

External links
 The World Championship on Sidecarcross.com

Living people
Swiss sidecarcross riders
Year of birth missing (living people)